Barbie Hsu (born 6 October 1976) is a Taiwanese actress, singer, and television host. She is best known for her leading role in the television series Meteor Garden (2001).

Life and career 
Hsu was born in Taipei, Taiwan on 6 October 1976. She was the second of three sisters, with the eldest being Hsu Si-hsien, and the youngest sister being Dee Hsu.

From 1994 to 2001, she was a member of the pop duo ASOS (originally called SOS for "Sisters of Shu", the name was changed to ASOS for legal reasons) with her youngest sister Dee Hsu. As such, Hsu is also known by her nickname "Big S" (while Dee Hsu is nicknamed "Little S") although she was the middle child in the family.

She is an animal lover and vegetarian.

As an actress, Hsu is best known for her lead role in the 2001 television series Meteor Garden. She has endorsed Tissot watches since 2005 and signed an additional 3-year contract in April 2008.

Hsu remains active in other work, such as modelling campaigns and variety shows.

Personal life
On 16 November 2010, Hsu married Chinese entrepreneur Wang Xiaofei in a civil ceremony in Beijing. They held their wedding banquet on Hainan Island on 22 March 2011. They have two children: a daughter, Wang Hsi-yueh (born 24 April 2014), and a son, Wang Hsi-lin (born 14 May 2016). On 22 November 2021, Hsu and Wang officially announced their divorce amid claims of infidelity and political differences over Taiwan.

On 8 March 2022, Hsu announced on both her Instagram and Facebook pages that she had married South Korean singer Koo Jun-yup. When the news of their marriage broke, it stirred the Asian entertainment industry and took over news headlines everywhere in both South Korea and Taiwan. Both Korean and Taiwanese fans congratulated and sent their blessings to the international celebrity couple. Fashion magazine Vogue Taiwan highlighted the couple's marriage as “a love story more thrilling than an idol drama.”

Hsu and Koo's relationship dates back to August 1997 when she first saw Koo performing on stage while in the audience for a concert by Taiwanese singer Tarcy Su. Hsu developed a crush on Koo and, after meeting again in 1998, the pair immediately fell in love.  Hsu's declaration of their love is her tattoo of his surname “Koo” on her right ankle. However, their relationship only lasted for about a year.  Due to “dating ban” in the K-pop industry, their relationship was opposed by Koo's management which led to their heartbreaking split in 2000.  They rekindled their romance after her divorce.  Although Hsu and Koo registered their marriage in Taiwan on 28 March 2022, the couple officially tied the knot on 8 February 2022, the day they registered their marriage in South Korea. According to Hsu's agent, the couple mainly communicate in English mixed with Korean.

Filmography

Film

Television series

Variety shows
 Guess Guess Guess - 1998 to 2000
 100% Entertainment - 1998 to 2006
 Gourmet Secrets of the Stars (大小愛吃) - 2007 to 2008
 Let's Dance (舞林大道) - 2008 to 2009
 Miss Beauty (Beauty小姐) - 2018 to Present
 我们是真正的朋友 - 2019

Bibliography

Awards and nominations

References

External links
 
 

1976 births
Living people
21st-century Taiwanese actresses
20th-century Taiwanese actresses
Korean-language singers of Taiwan
Taiwanese Buddhists
Taiwanese film actresses
Taiwanese television actresses
Taiwanese television presenters
Actresses from Taipei
Taiwanese idols
20th-century Taiwanese women singers
21st-century Taiwanese women singers
Taiwanese women television presenters